The Royal Armoury is a museum in the Royal Palace in Stockholm, Sweden. It contains many artifacts of Swedish military history and Swedish royalty. It is the oldest museum in Sweden, established in 1628 by King Gustavus Adolphus when he decided that his clothes from his campaign in Poland should be preserved for posterity.

A drinking horn made from a horn of the last aurochs bull and taken by the Swedish army as war booty from Jaktorów, Poland, during the Swedish invasion of Poland (1655–1660) is part of the collection of the museum.

Gallery

See also
 List of museums in Stockholm

References

External links
 
Virtual tour of the Livrustkammaren provided by Google Arts & Culture

Museums in Stockholm
Military and war museums in Sweden
1628 establishments in Sweden
Armour collections